Spectra Group is a Bangladeshi diversified conglomerate based in Dhaka. Khan Md. Aftabuddin is the chairperson of Spectra Group. Khalid Hussain Khan is the managing director of the group.

History 
Spectra Group started as Reza Construction in 1981 which became Reza Construction Limited in 1989.

In 2000, the group founded Spectra Convention Centre.

Spectra Properties Limited was founded in 2005 and Spectra Hexa Feeds Limited was found in 2006.

Spectra Oxygen Limited was established in 2007 and Sunypun Organics Limited was established in 2008.

Reza Construction Limited changed its name to Spectra Engineers Limited in 2011. It also founded Palm View Restaurant & Green Point Cafe that year.

Spectra Marine Division was established in 2012.

In October 2015, Spectra Group became a partner in the construction of Bhulta flyover.

Bangladesh Customs found traces of pork in meat and bone meal imported by Spectra Group, through Spectra Hexa Feeds Limited, in 2015 for manufacturing feed.

It jointly worked with Abdul Monem Limited for a portion of the N1 highway by Road Transport and Highways Division. The remaining portion went to Taher Brothers Limited.

In May 2021, the group launched a solar plant through its subsidiary Spectra Solar Park Limited in Shivalaya Upazila in Manikganj District. Spectra Solar Park Limited is jointly owned by Spectra and Shunfeng International Clean Energy Limited, a Chinese company. The project was financed by Asian Development Bank. The plant would sell the generated electricity to Bangladesh Power Development Board.

During the COVID-19 pandemic in Bangladesh, Spectra Oxygen Limited had difficulties maintaining supplies of oxygen as consumers were stockpiling oxygen cylinders.

Businesses 

 Spectra- Hexa Namsai Limited
 Reza Construction Limited
 Spectra Engineers Limited
 Spectra Convention Centre
 Spectra Properties Limited
 Spectra Hexa Feeds Limited
 Spectra Oxygen Limited
 Sunypun Organics Limited
 Reza Construction Limited
 Palm View Restaurant & Green Point Cafe
 Spectra Marine Division
 Spectra International Limited
 Spectra Dye-Chem Private Limited
 German Euro Chemicals Limited
 Tex Chem International
 Spectra Solar Park Limited

References 

1981 establishments in Bangladesh
Organisations based in Dhaka
Conglomerate companies of Bangladesh